Spondyloepiphyseal dysplasia congenita (abbreviated to SED more often than SDC) is a rare disorder of bone growth that results in dwarfism, characteristic skeletal abnormalities, and occasionally problems with vision and hearing. The name of the condition indicates that it affects the bones of the spine (spondylo-) and the ends of bones (epiphyses), and that it is present from birth (congenital). The signs and symptoms of spondyloepiphyseal dysplasia congenita are similar to, but milder than, the related skeletal disorders achondrogenesis type 2 and hypochondrogenesis. Spondyloepiphyseal dysplasia congenita is a subtype of collagenopathy, types II and XI.

Presentation
People with spondyloepiphyseal dysplasia are short-statured from birth, with a very short trunk and neck and shortened limbs. Their hands and feet, however, are usually average-sized. This type of dwarfism is characterized by a normal spinal column length relative to the femur bone. Adult height ranges from 0.9 meters (35 inches) to just over 1.4 meters (55 inches). Curvature of the spine (such as kyphoscoliosis and lordosis) progresses during childhood and can cause problems with breathing. Changes in the spinal bones (vertebrae) in the neck may also increase the risk of spinal cord damage. Other skeletal signs include flattened vertebrae (platyspondyly), a hip joint deformity in which the upper leg bones turn inward (coxa vara), and an inward- and downward-turning foot (called clubfoot). Decreased joint mobility and arthritis often develop early in life. Medical texts often state a mild and variable change to facial features, including  cheekbones close to the nose appearing flattened, although this appears to be unfounded.  Some infants are born with a cleft palate. Severe nearsightedness (high myopia) is sometimes present, as are other eye problems that can affect vision such as detached retinas. About one-quarter of people with this condition have mild to moderate hearing loss.

Causes

Spondyloepiphyseal dysplasia congenita is one of a spectrum of skeletal disorders caused by mutations in the COL2A1 gene. The protein made by this gene forms type II collagen, a molecule found mostly in cartilage and in the clear gel that fills the eyeball (the vitreous). Type II collagen is essential for the normal development of bones and other connective tissues. Mutations in the COL2A1 gene interfere with the assembly of type II collagen molecules, which prevents bones from developing properly and causes the signs and symptoms of this condition.

Spondyloepiphyseal dysplasia congenita is inherited in an autosomal dominant pattern, which means one copy of the altered gene is sufficient to cause the disorder.

Management 
There is no treatment for the underlying condition. Supportive/symptomatic treatment is based on the traits present in each person with the condition.

Notable people
  Michael Dunn, American actor, Tony winner, Wild Wild West, Star Trek
 Warwick Davis, English actor and TV presenter
 Lenny Rush, English actor

References

 Spranger: Bone Dysplasias, Urban & Fischer 2002,

Further reading
  GeneReviews/NIH/NCBI/UW entry on X-Linked Spondyloepiphyseal Dysplasia Tarda
  OMIM entries on X-Linked Spondyloepiphyseal Dysplasia Tarda

External links 

Autosomal dominant disorders
Collagen disease
Rare diseases